Channel 28 refers to several television stations:

Canada
The following television stations broadcast on digital or analog channel 28 (UHF frequencies covering 555.25-559.75 MHz) in Canada:
 CICO-DT-28 in Kitchener, Ontario
 CIHF-TV-16 in Mulgrave, Nova Scotia
 CITV-DT-1 in Red Deer, Alberta
 CKTM-DT in Trois-Rivières, Quebec

The following television stations operate on virtual channel 28 in Canada:
 CICO-DT-28 in Kitchener, Ontario

Mexico
The following regional network and local stations operate on virtual channel 28 in Mexico:

Regional network
Canal 28 in the state of Nuevo León

Local stations
XHABC-TDT in Chihuahua, Chihuahua
XHTRES-TDT in Mexico City

Australia
The Special Broadcasting Service (SBS) broadcast on UHF Channel 28 before the analogue switchover.

See also
 Channel 28 TV stations in Mexico
 Channel 28 digital TV stations in the United States
 Channel 28 virtual TV stations in the United States
 Channel 28 low-power TV stations in the United States

28